John Hunt of Northampton (c.1690 – 1754) was an 18th century sculptor, described as the foremost sculptor in Northamptonshire.

Life
He was born and raised in Northamptonshire, but was sent to London around 1710 to train as a sculptor under Grinling Gibbons.

In 1712, he was created a Freeman Mason of Northampton for donating a statue of King Charles II and other decorations on the frontage of All Saints' Church in that city.

He was found dead in his bed on 25 September 1754.

Works
Relief panel of Diana on garden frontage of Hinwick House (1710)
Monument to Sophia Whitwell at Oundle (1711)
Statue of King Charles II for All Saints' Church, Northampton (1712)
Monument to Sir William Boughton and Lady Boughton in the parish church of Newbold-on-Avon (1716)
Monument to Diana Orlebar at Podington (1716)
Monument to Frances Stratford at Overstone, Northamptonshire (1717)
Monument to Edward Stratford at Overstone, Northamptonshire (1721)
Monument to Samuel Knight at Wellingborough (1721)
Monument to William Wykes at Hazelbeech (1721)
Monument to Sir William Shuckburgh in Lower Shuckburgh (1724)
Bust of Cilena L'Anson Bradley in Long Buckby church (1726)
Monument to John Perkens at Kislingbury (1728)
Monument to Rebecca Ivory at All Saints' Church, Northampton (1728)
Monument to William Carter at Turvey, Bedfordshire (1728)
Monument to Benjamin Kidd at All Saints' Church, Northampton (1731)
Monument to Richard Cumberland at Peakirk (1731)
Monument to Mary Shortgrave in St Peter's Church, Northampton (1732)
Monument to Thomas Peace at Hardingstone (1732)
Monument to Elizabeth Trimmell at Brockhall, Northamptonshire (1737)
Monument to William Watson at Spratton (1738)
Monument to John Raynford at Faxton (1740)
Monument to Anthony Eynead at All Saints' Church, Northampton (1741)
Monument to John Smith at St Peter's Church, Northampton (1742)
Monument to Samuel Pennington in St Giles' Church, Northampton (1743)
Monument to Dorcas Stratford at All Saints' Church, Northampton (1744)
Monument to John Nicolls Raynford (1746) now in Victoria and Albert Museum

References

1754 deaths
People from Northampton
English sculptors